Detlev Rohwer (14 November 1917 – 30 March 1944) was a German Luftwaffe ace and recipient of the Knight's Cross of the Iron Cross during World War II.  The Knight's Cross of the Iron Cross was awarded to recognise extreme battlefield bravery or successful military leadership.  Detlev Rohwer was wounded on 29 March 1944 after a crash landing.  His leg was amputated by doctors and on 30 March 1944 he succumbed to his wounds.  During his career he was credited with 38 aerial victories, 12 on the Western Front and 26 on the Eastern Front.

Awards
 Flugzeugführerabzeichen
 Front Flying Clasp of the Luftwaffe
 Ehrenpokal der Luftwaffe (18 July 1941)
 Wound Badge (1939)
 in Black or Silver
 Iron Cross (1939)
 2nd Class
 1st Class
 Knight's Cross of the Iron Cross on 5 October 1941 as Leutnant and pilot in the I. / Jagdgeschwader 3

References

Citations

Bibliography

External links
Aces of the Luftwaffe 
Luftwaffe 1939–1945 History
TracesOfWar.com

1917 births
1944 deaths
Military personnel from Kiel
German World War II flying aces
Recipients of the Knight's Cross of the Iron Cross
People from the Province of Schleswig-Holstein
Luftwaffe personnel killed in World War II
Victims of aviation accidents or incidents in Germany